Sharq is a historic waterfront district of Kuwait City. It is Kuwait's oldest neighborhood although most pre-oil buildings were demolished. It is a business area and contains many notable buildings, skyscrapers and malls such as the Souq Sharq and Arraya Tower.

Embassies in Sharq

Embassies in Kuwait

References

External links

Suburbs of Kuwait City